Heaven Can Wait – The Best Ballads of Meat Loaf Vol. 1 is a 1996 compilation album by Meat Loaf. It features 12 ballads from his albums.

It was released on Smm Records in January 1996 and re-released in 2003 on EMI Gold.

Track listing
 "Heaven Can Wait" – 4:40
 "Two Out of Three Ain't Bad" – 5:24
 "Read 'Em and Weep" – 5:25
 "Surf's Up" – 4:20 
 "Everything Is Permitted" – 4:39
 "More Than You Deserve" – 6:56 
 "Lost Boys and Golden Girls" – 4:38
 "Left in the Dark" – 6:42
 "Man and a Woman" – 4:12
 "Fallen Angel" - 3:38
 "For Crying Out Loud" - 8:45
 "Standing on the Outside" - 3:58

All songs by Jim Steinman, except 9 (John Harris/Jerry Riopelle), 10 (Dick Wagner), 12 (Steve George/John Lang/Richard Page)

Meat Loaf albums
1996 greatest hits albums